Muscle Shoals National Heritage Area is a federally designated National Heritage Area in the northwestern portion of the U.S. state of Alabama. It is centered on the portion of the Tennessee River around Muscle Shoals and interprets the region's history and culture.

Muscle Shoals National Heritage Area comprises Lauderdale, Limestone, Colbert, Franklin, Lawrence and Morgan counties. Significant features of the heritage area include Wheeler Dam, Wilson Dam, Ivy Green, Rosenbaum House, Barton Hall and the northern end of the Natchez Trace.

Muscle Shoals National Heritage Area was  established by the Omnibus Public Land Management Act of 2009, which was signed into law on 30 March 2009. It is administered by the University of North Alabama.

References

External links
 Muscle Shoals National Heritage Area official website

 
2009 establishments in Alabama
National Heritage Areas of the United States
Protected areas established in 2009
Protected areas of Lauderdale County, Alabama
Protected areas of Limestone County, Alabama
Protected areas of Colbert County, Alabama
Protected areas of Franklin County, Alabama
Protected areas of Lawrence County, Alabama
Protected areas of Morgan County, Alabama